Youth Over Flowers is a South Korean travel-reality show which premiered on tvN in 2014.

Editions

I. Peru
Yoon Sang
You Hee-yeol
Lee Juck
The three singer-songwriters went on a backpacking tour of Peru, with Machu Picchu as their ultimate destination. They went to Peru on June 25, 2014, and were only informed about the trip three hours before the flight, causing them to travel with no luggage.

II. Laos
Yoo Yeon-seok
Son Ho-jun
Baro
Similar to the previous season, the three actors (who all starred in Reply 1994) were also not informed about their trip to Laos and only found out about it three hours before the flight. They went to Laos on July 7, 2014, and returned on July 14, 2014.

III. Iceland
Jung Sang-hoon
Jung Woo
Jo Jung-suk
Kang Ha-neul 
This season of Youth Over Flowers was initially announced with three cast members, Jung Sang-hoon, Jung Woo, and Jo Jung-suk. The three actors went to Iceland on November 25, 2015, whereas Kang Ha-neul, who thought he couldn't go due to his commitment to appear at the Blue Dragon Film Awards, was surprised by the Youth Over Flowers team and taken right after the award show to join the other actors on November 26, 2015. The four actors were given a mission to see aurora before they return home on December 4, 2015.

IV. Africa
Ahn Jae-hong
Ryu Jun-yeol
Go Kyung-pyo
Park Bo-gum
On January 22, 2016, Ahn Jae-hong, Ryu Jun-yeol, and Go Kyung-pyo were surprised by Youth Over Flowers team during the last day of their Reply 1988'''s celebratory vacation in Phuket, Thailand and were taken to Namibia. Park Bo-gum who had returned from Phuket early for his Music Bank filming was taken right after the recording concluded. The actors stayed in Namibia and Zimbabwe for 10 days and returned to South Korea on February 2, 2016.

V. Australia
Winner
Kim Jin-woo
Lee Seung-hoon
Song Min-ho
Kang Seung-yoon
After completing the mission on New Journey to the West 4, Song Min-ho chose to film Youth Over Flowers with his band (Winner) as his prize. The wish were granted and Youth Over Flowers'' team tricked Winner and took them to Australia on October 10, 2017. They stayed in Australia for 7 days and returned to South Korea on October 18, 2017.

Airtime

Ratings

2014

2016

2017

Awards and nominations

References

External links
  

2014 South Korean television series debuts
TVN (South Korean TV channel) original programming
South Korean variety television shows
South Korean reality television series
South Korean travel television series
Television shows set in Peru
Television shows set in Laos
Television shows set in Iceland
Television shows set in Namibia
Korean-language television shows